Ashita Dhawan is an Indian television actress, known for her roles in Sapna Babul Ka...Bidaai, Ladies Special and Nazar.

Career 
Ashita made her television debut in 2005 with Kesar that aired on StarPlus. She shot to fame with her performances in shows that includ Nazar and Yehh Jaadu Hai Jinn Ka, Sindoor Ki Keemat, Imlie, Dharam Patnii, and Yeh Rishta Kya Kehlata Hai.

She is currently playing the role of Yashoda Awasthi in Dangal TV's show Sindoor Ki Keemat.

In November 2022 she was cast for a role in the Balaji Telefilms’ new show Dharam Patnii.

Television

Personal life
Dhawan is married to Sailesh Gulabani since 20 January 2010. They have 2 kids together, twins Arhmaan and Amaira.

References

External links 

 

Living people
Indian television actresses
Actresses from Mumbai
1982 births